Canadian Music Creators Coalition is a group of Canadian music artists opposed to introducing legislation similar to the United States' DMCA into Canadian intellectual property law.  The group was officially formed April 26, 2006. An editorial from founding member Steven Page (formerly of the band Barenaked Ladies) announcing the formation of the coalition detailed three core principles, which included opposition to litigation against fans who download music, opposition to digital copy protection, and encouragement of a cultural policy that supported Canadian artists. According to Page, "This effort is not about giving our music away, it's about encouraging innovative approaches that will compensate musicians and protect music fans from litigation." The group received support from Charlie Angus, the NDP Heritage Critic. The Canadian Music Creators Coalition has provided a public voice on issues that affect its members, describing the Songwriters Association of Canada's proposal to monetize file sharing as a "forward thinking approach" and denouncing Bill C-61 for not focusing on the real needs of creators.

Notable Members 
 alexisonfire
 Randy Bachman
 Barenaked Ladies (founders)
 Billy Talent
 Broken Social Scene
 Bob Ezrin
 Leslie Feist
 Matthew Good
 Bill Henderson
 Greg Keelor
 Chantal Kreviazuk
 Avril Lavigne
 Lighthouse
 Tara MacLean
 Raine Maida
 Sarah McLachlan
 Metric
 The New Pornographers
 One Bad Son
 Blair Packham
 Sam Roberts
 Sloan
 Stars
 Steven Page
 Sum 41
 Arlen Thompson
 Three Days Grace

References

External links
The Canadian Music Creators Coalition

Music organizations based in Canada
2006 establishments in Canada